Stephan Fransen and Wesley Koolhof were the defending champions, but chose not to participate.

Máximo González and Guido Pella won the title, defeating Pere Riba and Jordi Samper-Montaña in the final, 2–6, 7–6(7–3), [10–5].

Seeds

Draw

Draw

References
 Main Draw

Challenger Ciudad de Guayaquil - Doubles